Hazelwood East High School is one of three high schools in the Hazelwood School District, St. Louis County, Missouri, the others being Hazelwood West High School and Hazelwood Central High School. It is at 11300 Dunn Road in Spanish Lake, Missouri, United States.

History

Hazelwood East High School was established in 1974 with the classes of 1975 and 1976 attending split class sessions in the existing Hazelwood High School building.  Hazelwood East and Hazelwood West students attended classes in the a.m. and Hazelwood Central students attended in the p.m.  Hazelwood East's new high school facility opened to students in the fall of 1976.

The school integrated an 'open-space' classroom concept. Because of this, many of the classrooms did not have four walls separating them from other classes. In the fall of 2005, the school's building underwent many renovations including 20 additional classrooms, additional windows and lockers, a science and math wing, and fully enclosed classrooms. After the 2007 redistricting plan went into effect, the student population dropped significantly, making the school less over-crowded as the students were partially re-distributed between Hazelwood East, Central, and West High Schools. East High has also received substantial renovations during the 2013 and 2014 school years, receiving an additional practice gymnasium, wheel chair accessibility to all floors, an expanded athletic wing, renovations to the 2nd and 3rd floors, and a new library, among other updates. Beginning, during the 2017-2018 school year, East High School begin housing 8th grader's under the new "East Middle School: 8th Grade Academy" after the original East Middle School was dissolved/absorbed from its original site to make way for the district's new Hazelwood Opportunity Center (Alternative School). The 6th and 7th graders of East Middle were redistributed to Southeast Middle School and other surrounding district middle schools, while the 8th graders have the option to apply to the 8th Grade Academy or remain at Southeast Middle School.

Supreme Court case

The landmark Supreme Court case Hazelwood School District v. Kuhlmeier originated at Hazelwood East in 1988 and involved journalism students who were members of The Spectrum staff. Ultimately, the case was decided in a 5-3 decision in favor of the Hazelwood School District, with the Court ruling that the administrator's censorship of newspaper content did not violate the First Amendment rights of the students.

Notable alumni
Wesley Bell, prosecutor for St. Louis County
Chris Brooks, American football wide receiver
DeMontie Cross, American football coach
Bryan J. Fletcher, American football tight end
Jamar Fletcher, American football cornerback
Jason Fletcher, sports agent
Terrell Fletcher, American football running back
Michael Gentry, creator of Anchorhead
Christian Kirksey, Linebacker for the Houston Texans
Gerald Nichols, American football defensive lineman
Al Olmsted, major league professional baseball player
Walt Powell, American football wide receiver/punt returner
 Lance Robertson (DJ Lance Rock), musician, disc Jockey,  actor 
Kerry Robinson, Major League Baseball
Brian Schaefering, American football defensive end
Scott Starks, American football cornerback
Bernard Whittington,  American football defensive end
Brandon Williams, American football wide receiver

References

External links
 Hazelwood East High School website
 Statistical Data about Hazelwood East
 Hazelwood School District website
 Hazelwood School District Map

Educational institutions established in 1974
High schools in St. Louis County, Missouri
Public high schools in Missouri